Dakota is an incorporated town in Stephenson County, Illinois. The population was 506 at the 2010 census, up from 499 in 2000.

History
Dakota was laid out in 1857 when the railroad was extended to that point. A post office has been in operation at Dakota since 1857.

Geography
Dakota is located at  (42.387936, -89.524289).

Demographics

As of the census of 2000, there were 499 people, 197 households, and 141 families residing in the town. The racial makeup of the town was 98.00% White, 0.80% African American, 0.40% Native American, 0.40% Asian, 0.40% from other races. Hispanic or Latino of any race were 0.40% of the population.

There were 197 households, out of which 32.0% had children under the age of 18 living with them, 58.9% were married couples living together, 11.2% had a female householder with no husband present, and 28.4% were non-families. 27.4% of all households were made up of individuals, and 11.7% had someone living alone who was 65 years of age or older. The average household size was 2.53 and the average family size was 3.03.

In the town, the population was spread out, with 24.6% under the age of 18, 9.2% from 18 to 24, 30.1% from 25 to 44, 22.2% from 45 to 64, and 13.8% who were 65 years of age or older. The median age was 38 years. For every 100 females, there were 96.5 males. For every 100 females age 18 and over, there were 92.8 males.

The median income for a household in the town was $43,942, and the median income for a family was $50,357. Males had a median income of $35,263 versus $25,000 for females. The per capita income for the town was $18,440. About 1.4% of families and 3.9% of the population were below the poverty line, including 3.6% of those under age 18 and 8.8% of those age 65 or over.

References

1869 establishments in Illinois
Populated places established in 1869
Towns in Stephenson County, Illinois
Towns in Illinois